Yong is a common Chinese name. From Chinese 勇 (yǒng) means "brave" or 永 (yǒng) meaning "perpetual, eternal".

Notable people from China with the single-syllable given name Yong

Historical figures
Murong Yong was the last emperor of the Xianbei state Western Yan.
Li Yong (prince) (died 838), Tang Dynasty prince.
Li Yong (chancellor) (died 820), Tang Dynasty chancellor.

Politics and society
Zhang Yong (politician) a former director of the China Food and Drug Administration.
Zhang Yong (restaurateur) a Chinese billionaire restaurateur, founder of Haidilao.
Li Yong (politician) (born 1951), Chinese politician.
Li Yong (television host) (1968–2018), Chinese television host.
Eric Xu or Xu Yong (徐勇, born 1964), co-founder of Baidu

TV personalities
Li Yong (television host) (1968–2018), Chinese television host

Sports
Zhang Yong (snooker player) Chinese snooker player.

Scholars
Xu Yong (historian) (徐勇, born 1949)

Military
Xu Yong (general) (许勇; born 1959)

Arts
Cheng Yong, contemporary Chinese painter.

References

Given names